
Gmina Kietrz is an urban-rural gmina (administrative district) in Głubczyce County, Opole Voivodeship, in south-western Poland, on the Czech border.

Location
Gmina Kietrz is bordered by the gminas of Baborów, Branice, Głubczyce and Pietrowice Wielkie. It also borders the Czech Republic.

Twin towns – sister cities

Gmina Kietrz is twinned with:
 Bílovec, Czech Republic
 Oldřišov, Czech Republic
 Tysmenytsia, Ukraine

References

Kietrz
Głubczyce County